Lenz Island is a small island in Beaverlodge Lake, Northern Saskatchewan, Canada.

References

Lake islands of Saskatchewan